The following is a list of notable deaths in June 2011.

Entries for each day are listed alphabetically by surname. A typical entry lists information in the following sequence:
 Name, age, country of citizenship at birth, subsequent country of citizenship (if applicable), reason for notability, cause of death (if known), and reference.

June 2011

1
Jaehoon Ahn, 70, North Korean-born American journalist and researcher, founding director of Radio Free Asia's Korean language service.
Cameron McVicar Batjer, 91, American lawyer.
Munir Dar, 76, Pakistani field hockey player, 1960 Olympic gold medalist.
Matt Fong, 57, American politician, California State Treasurer (1995–1999), skin cancer.
Frank Ponta, 75, Australian paralympian, after long illness.
Devi Prasad, 89, Indian artist and peace activist.
Haleh Sahabi, 54, Iranian humanitarian, daughter of Ezzatollah Sahabi, cardiac arrest.
Albert Wiggins, 76, American Olympic swimmer, aortic dissection.

2
Ray Bryant, 79, American jazz pianist, after long illness.
Mark Cooney, 60, American football player (Green Bay Packers).
Ron Dunn, 83, Australian rules footballer.
Willem Duys, 82, Dutch radio and television presenter and record producer, infection.
Josephine Hart, 69, Irish-born British novelist and poetry promoter, ovarian cancer.
Sir Philip Holland, 94, British politician, MP for Acton (1959–1964); Carlton (1966–1983) and Gedling (1983–1987).
Davorin Marčelja, 87, Croatian Olympic athlete.
Walter R. Peterson, Jr., 88, American politician, Governor of New Hampshire (1969–1973), lung cancer.
Willie Phiri, 57, Zambian footballer.
Geronimo Pratt, 63, American political activist (Black Panther Party), heart attack.
Philip Rahtz, 90, British archaeologist.
Joel Rosenberg, 57, American science fiction author, heart attack.
Albertina Sisulu, 92, South African anti-apartheid activist.
Keith Smith, 93, Australian radio and television personality (The Pied Piper), children's writer.
Lavina Washines, 71, American tribal leader, first female leader of the Yakima Nation (2006–2008).

3
Lee J. Ames, 90, American artist and illustrator, heart failure.
James Arness, 88, American actor (Gunsmoke), natural causes.
Harry Bernstein, 101, British-born American author.
Wally Boag, 90, American performer (Disneyland's Golden Horseshoe Revue).
Marion Fuller Brown, 94, American politician and environmental activist.
Papa Joe Chevalier, 62, American sports talk radio host, stroke.
Bruce Crozier, 72, Canadian politician, Ontario MPP for Essex South (1993–1999) and Essex (since 1999), aortic aneurysm.
Andrew Gold, 59, American singer-songwriter ("Lonely Boy", "Thank You for Being a Friend"), heart attack.
Pat Jackson, 95, English film and television director.
John Henry Johnson, 81, American football player (San Francisco 49ers, Pittsburgh Steelers) and Hall of Famer.
Miriam Karlin, 85, British actress and activist, cancer.
Ilyas Kashmiri, 47, Pakistani jihadist militant, leader of Harkatul Jihad al-Islami, drone strike.
Jack Kevorkian, 83, American physician and right to die activist, pulmonary thrombosis.
Bhajan Lal, 80, Indian politician, Chief Minister of Haryana (1979–1985; 1991–1996), cardiac arrest.
Peter Murphy, 88, Irish television presenter (RTÉ).
Sammy Ofer, 89, Israeli businessman, after long illness.
Ray Pahl, 75, British sociologist, cancer.
Jack Richardson, 89, Australian politician, member of the New South Wales Legislative Assembly for Ashfield (1952–1953).
Benny Spellman, 79, American R&B singer, respiratory failure.
Gus Tyler, 99, American socialist activist.
Jan van Roessel, 86, Dutch Olympic footballer (Willem II Tilburg).

4
Dimi Mint Abba, 52, Mauritanian singer, brain haemorrhage.
Dante Ambrosio, 59, Filipino ethnologist, astronomer, college professor, and activist.
Shibli al-Aysami, 86, Syrian politician and Arab nationalist figure.
Lilian Jackson Braun, 97, American author (Cat Who series), natural causes.
Claudio Bravo, 74, Chilean painter, epilepsy.
Tommy Brent, 88, American theatrical producer.
Gordon Colling, 78, British trade unionist, Chair of the Labour Party (1994–1995).
Lindsey Durlacher, 36, American Greco-Roman wrestler.
Lawrence Eagleburger, 80, American diplomat and politician, Secretary of State (1992–1993).
Curth Flatow, 91, German dramatist and screenwriter, natural causes.
Maurice Garrel, 88, French actor.
Donald Hewlett, 90, English actor, pneumonia.
Juan Francisco Luis, 70, U.S. Virgin Islands politician, Governor of the United States Virgin Islands (1978–1987), Lieutenant Governor (1975–1978).
Rosenery Mello do Nascimento, 45, Brazilian model and Playboy Playmate, brain aneurysm.
Ian Mitchell, 86, English cricketer, natural causes.
Andreas P. Nielsen, 58, Danish author and composer, cancer.
Martin Rushent, 63, English record producer (Buzzcocks, Human League, The Stranglers).
Betty Taylor, 91, American performer (Disneyland's Golden Horseshoe Revue).
Misael Vilugrón, 73, Chilean boxer.
Felix Zandman, 83, American entrepreneur.

5
Mark H. Beaubien, Jr., 68, American politician, member of the Illinois House of Representatives (since 1997).
Léon Bollendorff, 96, Luxembourgian politician.
Scott Bostwick, 49, American football player and coach (Western Washington, Northwest Missouri State), heart attack.
Leon Botha, 26, South African artist and musical performer, progeria-related heart failure.
John Glasby, 82, British chemist and writer.
Azam Khan, 61, Bangladeshi pop singer, cancer.
Gordon Lorenz, 68, British songwriter.
Ludo Martens, 65, Belgian political activist.
Célestin Oliver, 80, French Olympic footballer.
Ken Purpur, 79, American ice hockey player.

6
John R. Alison, 98, American airman, launched the Allied Reoccupation of Burma during World War II.
Rafael Arnal, 96, Venezuelan Olympic shooter.
Zev Birger, 85, Israeli activist, traffic collision.
John Boswall, 91, British actor (Pirates of the Caribbean: Dead Man's Chest, Rome).
Claudio Cavazza, 77, Italian entrepreneur, founder of Sigma-Tau pharmaceuticals.
Bill Closs, 89, American basketball player (Philadelphia Warriors, Fort Wayne Pistons).
Declan Costello, 84, Irish politician, TD for Dublin North-West (1951–1969); Dublin South-West (1973–1977), Attorney General (1973–1977) and High Court judge.
Eleanor Dapkus, 87, American baseball player (All-American Girls Professional Baseball League), breast cancer.
Dulce Figueiredo, 83, Brazilian First Lady (1979–1985), widow of João Figueiredo.
Werner Fischer, 70, Austrian Olympic sailor.
Benjamín González, 53, Spanish Olympic athlete, mountaineering accident. (body found on this date)
James A. Green, 80, American Pennsylvania Commissioner of Elections, Pennsylvania State Representative, Butler County Commissioner, Slippery Rock Borough Council member.
Stefan Kuryłowicz, 62, Polish architect, plane crash.
Amnon Niv, 81, Israeli architect.
Masashi Ohuchi, 67, Japanese weightlifter, Olympic silver (1968) and bronze (1964) medalist.
Shrek, 16, New Zealand celebrity sheep, euthanised.

7
Paul Dickson, 74, American football player (St. Louis Rams, Dallas Cowboys, Minnesota Vikings), blood infection.
Angelino Fons, 75, Spanish film director.
Walid Gholmieh, 73, Lebanese musician, director of Conservatoire Libanais.
Genaro Hernández, 45, American former world super featherweight champion boxer, cancer.
Liam Kelly, 88, Irish republican and politician.
Kim Jun-Yop, 91, South Korean historian.
Vladimir Lavrov, 91, Soviet diplomat and ambassador.
José Pagán, 76, Puerto Rican baseball player (San Francisco Giants, Pittsburgh Pirates), Alzheimer's disease.
Mietek Pemper, 91, Polish-born German Holocaust survivor, compiled and typed Oskar Schindler's list.
Nataraja Ramakrishna, 88, Indian dance guru, after long illness.
Maksud Sadikov, 48, Russian Islamic scholar and theologian, shot.
Jorge Semprún, 87, Spanish writer and politician.
Leonard B. Stern, 87, American television writer (Get Smart, The Honeymooners) and publisher (Mad Libs).
Edgar Tekere, 74, Zimbabwean politician, cancer.
Gavriel Tsifroni, 96, Israeli journalist.
Sven-Olof Walldoff, 82, Swedish conductor and composer.
Haim Yisraeli, 84, Israeli civil servant.

8
Anatole Abragam, 96, French physicist.
Larry Border, 60, American politician, member of the West Virginia House of Delegates (since 1990), stroke.
Nasir Jalil, 56, Singaporean footballer.
George Landow, 67, American experimental filmmaker.
Clara Luper, 88, American civil rights activist, after long illness.
John Mackenzie, 83, Scottish film director (The Long Good Friday, Ruby).
Paul Massie, 78, Canadian BAFTA-winning actor and educator.
Fazul Abdullah Mohammed, 38?, Comorian al-Qaeda terrorist, planned 1998 United States embassy bombings, shot.
Jim Northrup, 71, American baseball player (Detroit Tigers, Montreal Expos, Baltimore Orioles), seizure.
Steve Popovich, 68, American record executive, founder of Cleveland International Records.
Alan Rubin, 68, American trumpeter (The Blues Brothers), lung cancer .
Roy Skelton, 79, British actor (Rainbow, Doctor Who), stroke.
Oliver Fiennes, 85, British Anglican priest, Dean of Lincoln (1969–1989).

9
Jameel Fakhri, 65, Pakistani actor, after long illness.
M. F. Husain, 95, Indian artist, heart attack.
Josip Katalinski, 63, Bosnian footballer, after long illness.
Tomoko Kawakami, 41, Japanese voice actress (Fushigi Yûgi, Revolutionary Girl Utena), ovarian cancer.
Ali Khodadadi, 64, Iranian carpet weaver, heart failure.
Mike Mitchell, 55, American basketball player (Cleveland Cavaliers, San Antonio Spurs), cancer.
Idwal Robling, 84, Welsh Olympic footballer and broadcaster.
Vladimir Shalin, 46, Russian football player and coach.
Billy Shipp, 80, American football player (New York Giants, Toronto Argonauts, Montreal Alouettes).
Ignazio Vella, 82, American artisanal cheesemaker and businessman, long illness.

10
Art Balinger, 96, American actor.
Jeanne Bice, 71, American entrepreneur and television personality.
Pam Brown, 58, American politician, Nebraska state senator (1995–2006), ovarian cancer.
Yuri Budanov, 47, Russian military officer and war criminal, shot.
Cosimo Caliandro, 29, Italian middle-distance runner, motorcycle collision.
Mary E. Clarke, 86, American army general.
Theo Dubois, 100, Canadian rower.
Abdi Shakur Sheikh Hassan, Somali politician, interior minister (since 2010), suicide bombing.
Kenny Hawkes, 42, British DJ and music producer, after short illness.
James P. Hosty, 86, American law-enforcement agent (FBI), prostate cancer.
Esmond Kentish, 94, Jamaican Test cricketer.
Sir Patrick Leigh Fermor, 96, British author and soldier.
Brian Lenihan Jnr, 52, Irish politician, TD for Dublin West (since 1996) and Minister for Finance (2008–2011), pancreatic cancer.
Godfrey Myles, 42, American football player (Dallas Cowboys), stroke.
Franz Reitz, 82, German cyclist, National Champion (1957)
Jim Rodnunsky, 54, Canadian-born American cinematographer and technician, inventor of the Cablecam system, brain cancer.
Hoda Saber, 52, Iranian dissident, heart attack following a hunger strike.
Al Schwimmer, 94, American-born Israeli businessman, founder of Israel Aerospace Industries.
Barbara Starfield, 78, American paediatrician, advocate for primary health care.
Carol Stone, 96, American actress.
György Szabados, 71, Hungarian physician, pianist, and composer.

11
Tariq Alam Abro, 53, Pakistani writer, kidney failure.
Paul Alter, 89, American television director (Family Feud).
Giorgio Celli, 75, Italian entomologist and politician (The Greens–European Free Alliance).
Gustav Ciamaga, 81, Canadian composer, music educator and writer, cancer.
Robert Marie Jean Victor de Chevigny, 90, French-born Mauritanian Roman Catholic prelate, Bishop of Nouakchott (1973–1995).
Jyotirmoy Dey, 56, Indian journalist, shot.
Gunnar Fischer, 100, Swedish cinematographer (The Seventh Seal).
Eliyahu M. Goldratt, 64, Israeli physicist and management guru.
Noel Granger, 79–80, Australian Olympic wrestler.
Kurt Nielsen, 80, Danish tennis player, only Dane to have played in a men's Grand Slam singles final.
Jaime Pieras Jr., 87, Puerto Rican jurist. 
Graham B. Purcell, Jr., 92, American politician, U.S. Representative from Texas (1962–1973).
Seth Putnam, 43, American musician (Anal Cunt).
Wolfgang Reinhardt, 68, German Olympic silver medal-winning (1964) pole vaulter.
Raúl Marcelo Pacífico Scozzina, 89, Argentinian Roman Catholic prelate, Bishop of Formosa (1957–1978).
Darko Radovanović, 35, Serbian singer, traffic collision.
Vitali Silitski, 38, Belarusian political scientist, kidney cancer.
Jack Smith, 82, British artist.
William Carrington Thompson, 95, American politician and jurist, Virginia House of Delegates (1959–1968), Senate (1968–1973) and Supreme Court (1980–1983).
Edythe Scott Bagley, 86,  American author, activist, educator and older sister of Coretta Scott King.

12
Les Abbott, 95, Australian rugby league footballer.
René Audet, 91, Canadian Roman Catholic prelate, Bishop of Joliette (1968–1990).
Geoffrey Fisken, 95, New Zealand World War II flying ace.
Carl Gardner, 83, American singer (The Coasters).
Alan Haberman, 81, American grocer, first to use the barcode system, heart and lung disease.
John Hospers, 93, American philosopher, first Libertarian Party presidential nominee (1972).
Christopher Neame, 68, British film and TV producer and writer, aneurysm.
Kathryn Tucker Windham, 93, American author and journalist.
Sir John Wilton, 89, British diplomat.
Laura Ziskin, 61, American film producer (Pretty Woman, Spider-Man, What About Bob?), breast cancer.

13
David C. Baldus, 75, American educator and anti-death penalty activist, cancer.
Hugh John Beazley, 94, British Royal Air Force airman.
Johannes Kemperman, 86, Dutch mathematician.
King's Theatre, 20, Irish racehorse.
Germano Meneghel, 49, Brazilian vocalist (Olodum).
*Jérôme Nday Kanyangu Lukundwe, 82, Congolese Roman Catholic prelate, Bishop of Kongolo (1971–2007).
Betty Neumar, 79, American murder suspect.
Romeo Olea, 49, Filipino radio journalist (DWEB), shot.
William J. Spahr, 89, American intelligence analyst (CIA) and author, pneumonia.
Burt Styler, 86, American screenwriter (The Carol Burnett Show, My Favorite Martian, All in the Family), heart failure.

14
Tom Addison, 75, American football player (New England Patriots).
Tayo Aderinokun, 56, Nigerian entrepreneur.
Milivoj Ašner, 98, Croatian-born Austrian Nazi war criminal.
Helen Clifton, 63, British Salvation Army commissioner.
Ambrose Griffiths, 82, British Roman Catholic prelate, Bishop of Hexham and Newcastle (1992–2004).
Asad Ali Khan, 74, Indian musician, recipient of the Padma Bhushan.
Augusto Ramírez Ocampo, 77, Colombian politician, Mayor of Bogotá (1982–1984), Foreign Minister (1984–1986), heart ailment.
Oscar Sambrano Urdaneta, 82, Venezuelan writer.
Peter Schamoni, 77, German film director.
Mack Self, 81, American rockabilly musician and songwriter.
Badi Uzzaman, 72, Indian-British actor (Eastern Promises, Another Year), chest infection.

15
Guy Amouretti, 85–86, French table tennis player.
Bob Banner, 89, American television producer and director (The Carol Burnett Show), Parkinson's disease.
Joko Beck, 94, American Zen Buddhist teacher, founder of the Ordinary Mind School, after long illness.
John Ehrman, 91, British historian.
Ted Gray, 86, American baseball player (Detroit Tigers).
Bill Haast, 100, American snake expert, director of the Miami Serpentarium.
Zack du Plessis, 61, South African actor (Orkney Snork Nie).
Linda Scheid, 68, American politician, Minnesota state senator (since 1997), ovarian cancer.
Sir Apenera Short, 95, Cook Islands politician, Queen's Representative (1990–2000).
Pavel Stolbov, 81, Russian gymnast, 1956 Olympic gold medalist.

16
Gerald Abramovitz, 82, South African architect and designer, assault-related injuries.
Kirby Allan, 83, American record producer, house fire.
James Allason, 98, British politician and soldier, MP for Hemel Hempstead (1959–1974).
Claudia Bryar, 93, American actress (Psycho II, The Shakiest Gun in the West).
Wild Man Fischer, 66, American street musician, heart failure.
Abrar Hussain, 46, Pakistani Olympic boxer, shot.
Yehuda Kiel, 94, Israeli educator and biblical scholar.
Östen Mäkitalo, 72, Swedish electrical engineer.
Dorice Reid, 67, Cook Islander tourism official and businesswoman, High Commissioner designate to New Zealand.
Twins Seven Seven, 67, Nigerian artist, complications of a stroke.

17
Colin Aamodt, 89, Australian football player.
Björn-Olof Alholm, 86, Finnish ambassador.
Kjell Bohlin, 82, Norwegian politician.
David Brockhoff, 83, Australian rugby union player and coach.
Jacquie de Creed, 54, British stuntwoman, air crash.
Betty Fox, 73, Canadian cancer research activist, founder of the Terry Fox Foundation.
Ben Grussendorf, 69, American politician, Speaker of the Alaska House of Representatives (1985–1989; 1991–1993).
E. Philip Howrey, 73, American economist, bicycle accident.
Ruth M. Kirk, 81, American politician, Maryland House of Delegates (1983–2011).
Rex Mossop, 83, Australian rugby player and television commentator.
Fritz Semmelmann, 82, German footballer.
Nathan Sharon, 86, Israeli biochemist.
George M. White, 90, American architect, Architect of the Capitol (1971–1995), complications of Parkinson's disease.

18
Echendu Adiele, 32, Nigerian footballer.
Alan Bamford, 80, British academic.
Ulrich Biesinger, 77, German football player.
Yelena Bonner, 88, Russian human rights activist, after long illness.
Cheryl B, 38, American poet and performance artist.
Frederick Chiluba, 68, Zambian politician, President (1991–2002), heart attack.
Clarence Clemons, 69, American saxophonist (E Street Band) and singer ("You're a Friend Of Mine"), complications following a stroke.
A. Whitney Ellsworth, 75, American editor and publisher (The New York Review of Books), pancreatic cancer.
Karl Frei, 94, Swiss gymnast, 1948 Olympic gold medalist .
Brian Haw, 62, British peace activist, lung cancer.
Gustaf Kjellvander, 31, Swedish singer-songwriter.
Benedek Litkey, 69, Hungarian Olympic sailor.
Robin Nash, 84, British television producer.
Bob Pease, 70, American integrated circuit engineer.
John Perumattam, 89, Indian Syro-Malabar Catholic hierarch, Bishop of Ujjain (1968–1998).
Shlomo Pinto, 57, Israeli Paralympic athlete.

19
Don Diamond, 90, American actor (F Troop, The Adventures of Kit Carson, Zorro).
Tom Hungerford, 96, Australian author.
Rezső Kende, 102, Hungarian Olympic gymnast.
John Kerr, Sr., 67, Scottish-born Canadian soccer player.
Fernand Linssen, 82, Belgian Olympic sprinter.
Fyodor Grigoryevich Reshetnikov, 91, Russian physicist, chemist, and metallurgist, academician of RAS.

20
Alexander Abrosimov, 62, Russian mathematician and teacher.
Thomas N. Armstrong III, 78, American museum curator.
Ryan Dunn, 34, American reality television star (Jackass, Viva La Bam, CKY), car crash.
Safa Giray, 79/80, Turkish civil engineer and politician, 3-time minister.
Magomet Isayev, 83, Russian Esperantist, translator and linguist.
Domnitsa Lanitou-Kavounidou, 97, Greek Olympic sprinter.
Ottilie Patterson, 79, Northern Irish singer.
Vladimir Pettay, 38, Russian football referee, plane crash.
Eric Swenson, 64, American businessman, co-founder of Thrasher, suicide by gunshot.
Robert H. Widmer, 95, American aeronautical engineer.

21
E. M. Broner, 83, American author, multiple organ failure.
Arthur Budgett, 95, British racehorse trainer.
Mark Gerard, 76, American racehorse trainer.
Anthony Herrera, 67, American actor (As the World Turns), cancer.
Kothapalli Jayashankar, 76, Indian educator and politician, after long illness.
Bruce Kinloch, 91, British soldier and game warden.
Robert Kroetsch, 83, Canadian novelist and poet, car crash.
Lucifer, 50, American wrestler.
Alena Reichová, 77, Czech Olympic gymnast.
Suresh Tendulkar, 72, Indian economist, cardiac arrest.

22
Sir John Agnew, 6th Baronet, 60, British landowner, prostate cancer.
Kader Asmal, 76, South African politician, heart attack.
Guy Coulombe, 75, Canadian civil servant, lung cancer.
Fanny de Sivers, 90, Estonian linguist and translator.
Carmelo Giaquinta, 81, Argentinian Roman Catholic prelate, Archbishop of Resistencia (1993–2005).
Harley Hotchkiss, 83, Canadian businessman, member of Hockey Hall of Fame, prostate cancer.
Albert Johnson, 90, English footballer (Everton), Alzheimer's disease.
Robert Miller, 72, American art dealer, infection.
Sir Stephen Olver, 95, British diplomat, High Commissioner to Sierra Leone (1969–1972) and Cyprus (1973–1975)
Cyril Ornadel, 87, British conductor and composer.
Coşkun Özarı, 80, Turkish footballer and coach.
David Rayfiel, 87, American screenwriter (Out of Africa, Three Days of the Condor), heart failure.
Nataša Urbančič, 65, Slovene athlete.
Ken Vaughan, 76, Australian politician, member of the Legislative Assembly of Queensland (1979–1995).
Mike Waterson, 70, British folk singer, cancer.
John Waite, 81, South African cricketer.
Zbyněk Zeman, 82, Czech historian.

23
Vladislav Achalov, 65, Russian general and activist.
J. Warren Bettis, 86, American jurist.
Gene Colan, 84, American comic book artist (Daredevil, Blade, Howard the Duck), complications from liver disease and a broken hip.
Gaye Delorme, 64, Canadian musician, heart attack.
Peter Falk, 83, American actor (Columbo, Pocketful of Miracles, The Princess Bride).
Stéphane Franke, 47, German athlete.
Len King, 86, Australian politician and jurist, Chief Justice of the Supreme Court of South Australia (1978–1995).
Dennis Marshall, 25, Costa Rican footballer, car crash.
Patricia Merbreier, 86, American actress and television personality (Captain Noah and His Magical Ark).
Basil Mitchell, 94, British philosopher.
Christiane Desroches Noblecourt, 97, French Egyptologist.
Arthur Motyer, 85, Canadian educator and writer.
Attilio Ruffini, 85, Italian politician, Minister of Defence (1977–1980) and Minister of Foreign Affairs (1980).
Fred Steiner, 88, American television composer (Perry Mason, Star Trek, The Twilight Zone).

24
Michelle Brunner, 57, British bridge player, writer and teacher, breast cancer.
Tomislav Ivić, 77, Croatian football coach (Ajax).
Richie Myers, 81, American baseball player (Chicago Cubs), complications from a fall.
F. Gilman Spencer, 85, American Pulitzer Prize-winning newspaper editor.
Richard Webster, 60, British historian and writer, heart failure.
A. H. Woodfull, 98, British product designer.

25
Friedrich Adrario, 92, German military officer in World War II, Iron Cross recipient.
Dorothea Austin, 89, Austrian-born American pianist and composer.
George Ballas, 85, American entrepreneur, inventor of the Weed Eater.
Nick Charles, 64, American sportscaster (CNN Sports Tonight), bladder cancer.
Anne Field, 85, British army officer.
Shelby Grant, 74, American actress (Our Man Flint, Fantastic Voyage, Medical Center), brain aneurysm.
Martin H. Greenberg, 70, American anthologist, cancer.
Jean Harris, 66, American politician and LGBT activist.
Jan Kułakowski, 80, Polish politician, Member of the European Parliament (2004–2009).
Viktor Mikhaylov, 77, Russian nuclear scientist.
J.O. Patterson, Jr., 76, American politician and religious leader, first black mayor of Memphis (1982).
Alice Playten, 63, American actress (Henry, Sweet Henry), heart failure.
Goff Richards, 66, English brass band arranger and composer, illness.
Betty Roberts, 88, American politician and jurist, Oregon Supreme Court (1982–1986), pulmonary fibrosis.
Paulo Renato Souza, 65, Brazilian politician, Minister of Education (1995–2002), heart attack.
Margaret Tyzack, 79, British actress (The First Churchills, 2001: A Space Odyssey, Match Point), short illness.

26
James Craig Anderson, 47, American murder victim, beaten and ran over.
Adalberto Escobar, 62, Paraguayan footballer 
Edith Fellows, 88, American actress, natural causes.
Simon Heere Heeresma, 79, Dutch writer.
Jung Jung-suk, 28, South Korean women's football player.
Norma Lyon, 81, American farmer and butter sculpture artist.
Robert Morris, 78, American cryptographer, complications of dementia.
Sidney Hollis Radner, 91, American collector of Harry Houdini memorabilia.
Alan Rodger, Baron Rodger of Earlsferry, 66, British jurist, Supreme Court judge.
Christopher Shale, 56, British political aide.
Jan van Beveren, 63, Dutch footballer and coach.
Barry Wilkins, 64, Canadian hockey player (Vancouver Canucks, Boston Bruins), lung cancer.

27
William L. Adams, 97, American businessman.
Stuart Appelle, 65, American professor and writer.
Ken Bainbridge, 90, English footballer (West Ham). (death reported on this date)
Betty Callaway, 83, British ice skating trainer (Torvill and Dean).
Lorenzo Charles, 47, American basketball player (NC State, Atlanta Hawks), bus accident.
Mike Doyle, 64, English footballer (Manchester City), liver failure.
Owen Drake, 75, American politician, member of the Alabama House of Representatives, cancer.
Orvin B. Fjare, 93, American politician, U.S. Representative from Montana (1955–1957).
Michel Yehuda Lefkowitz, 97, Israeli rabbi.
Thierry Martens, 69, Belgian science fiction, detective novels, and comics author.
Erling Olsen, 84, Danish politician, natural causes.
Richard Harding Poff, 87, American jurist and politician, U.S. Representative from Virginia (1953–1972).
Lura Lynn Ryan, 76, American First Lady of Illinois (1999–2003), cancer.
Elmer Sexauer, 85, American baseball player (Brooklyn Dodgers), cardiac arrest.
Elaine Stewart, 81, American actress and model, after long illness.
Charles W. Whalen, Jr., 90, American politician, U.S. Representative from Ohio (1967–1979).
Maciej Zembaty, 67, Polish writer and singer.

28
Olav Askvik, 96, Norwegian politician.
Paul Baghdadlian, 57,  Armenian-American singer-songwriter and businessman, lung cancer.
Billy Baldwin, 62, American baseball player (Detroit Tigers, New York Mets).
Giorgio Bernardin, 83, Italian footballer.
Benton Flippen, 90, American fiddler, heart attack.
Howard Fox, 90, American baseball executive.
Richard Fox, 57, Irish-born British jockey and actor.
Osamu Kobayashi, 76, Japanese voice actor and executive director, pancreatic cancer.
Newt Loken, 92, American gymnastics coach (University of Michigan).
Ants Paju, 66, Estonian athlete, journalist and politician.
Angélico Vieira, 28, Portuguese actor (Morangos com Açúcar) and singer (D'ZRT), car accident.
Michael Wenning, 75, South African-born American minister, leukemia and kidney failure.

29
R. C. Alston, 78, English bibliographer.
Barbatana, 82, Brazilian football coach and player, Alzheimer's disease.
Billy Beck, 86, American actor and clown.
Larry Bogdanow, 64, American architect, brain tumor.
Billy Costello, 55, American former WBC world light welterweight champion boxer, lung cancer.
Carlos Diarte, 57, Paraguayan footballer, cancer.
David Dunseith, 76, British broadcaster (BBC Radio Ulster).
Stefano Gobbi, 81, Italian Roman Catholic priest, founder of the Marian Movement of Priests.
Kaya Köstepen, 76, Turkish footballer.
Domenico Pecile, 88, Italian Roman Catholic prelate, Bishop of Latina-Terracina-Sezze-Priverno (1983–1998).
K. D. Sethna, 106, Indian scholar and writer.

30
David G. Boschert, 63, American politician, member of the Maryland House of Delegates (1999–2007), cancer.
Barry Bremen, 64, American marketing executive and sports imposter, cancer.
Karl Brommann, 90, German Waffen-SS officer, Iron Cross recipient.
Don Buddin, 77, American baseball player (Boston Red Sox, Houston Colt .45s, Detroit Tigers).
Preston Carpenter, 77, American football player (Cleveland Browns, Pittsburgh Steelers, Washington Redskins).
Christy Essien-Igbokwe, 50, Nigerian musician.
Dina Golan, 65, Israeli singer and actress, cancer.
Tom Kruse, 96, Australian outback mailman and documentary subject (The Back of Beyond).
Sir David Loram, 86, British admiral.
Ruth Roberts, 84, American songwriter ("Meet the Mets"), lung cancer.
Jimmy Roselli, 85, American singer, heart complications.
Jay Dee Springbett, 36, British-born Australian record industry executive and Australian Idol judge.
Georg Sterzinsky, 75, German Roman Catholic cardinal, Archbishop of Berlin (1989–2011), after long illness.
Sean Wight, 47, Scottish-born Australian football player, lung cancer.

References 

2011-06
 06